A conglomerate is a combination of multiple business entities operating in entirely different industries under one corporate group, usually involving a parent company and many subsidiaries.

Conglomerates are typically large and multinational.

Africa

Algeria 
 Cevital

Kenya 

 KCB Bank Group
 Centum Investments
 Nation Media Group
 Co-operative Bank Group
 Equity Bank Group
 I&M Bank Group
 Olympia Capital Holdings
 Sameer Group
 TransCentury Limited

Morocco 
 Siger
 Société Nationale d'Investissement (SNI)

Nigeria
 Dangote Group
 John Holt Plc
 Transnational Corporation of Nigeria
 United Africa Company of Nigeria

South Africa
Bidvest Group
Vodacom
MTN
Cell C
Telkom
Eskom
Denel
Transnet
SABC
eNCA
DStv
Super Sports
Standard Bank
ABSA
FirstRand Limited
Nedbank
Capitec
Sasol
Naspers
Anglo American Platinum Ltd
Investec
Remgro
Old Mutual
Sanlam
Shoprite Holdings

Uganda

 Alam Group
 Aya Group
 BMK Group
 DFCU Group
 International Medical Group
 Madhvani Group
 Mara Group
 Mukwano Group
 Mulwana Group
 New Vision Group
 Ruparelia Group
 Simba Group
 Tirupati Group
 Wavah Group

Asia

Bahrain
 Fakhro Group
 Nass Corporation
 Yusuf bin Ahmed Kanoo Group

Bangladesh

 A K Khan & Company
 Advanced Chemical Industries
 Akij
 Ananda Group
 Bashundhara Group
 Beximco
 City Group
 Concord Group
 Confidence Group
 Grameen
 Habib Group
 KDS Group
 M. M. Ispahani Limited
 Nasir Group
 Nassa Group
 Navana Group
 Orion Group
 Partex Group
 Summit Group
 T K Group of Industries
 Transcom Group
 United Group

China, Mainland

 Beijing Enterprises
 Beijing North Star
 BYD
 China Aerospace Science and Technology Corporation
 China Resources
 China Everbright Group
 China Huaneng Group
 China Merchants Group
 China Metallurgical Group Corporation
 China Poly Group Corporation
 CIMC
 CITIC Group
 Comac
 COSCO
 CRRC Group
 Dalian Wanda Group
 Fosun International
 Founder Group
 Guangxi Guitang Group
 Hasee
 Huawei
 Hytera
 JXD
 Legend Holdings
 Liaoning Chengda
 Maoye International
 Meizu
 Nepstar
 Orient Group
 Ping An Bank
 Ping An Insurance
 Shanghai Industrial Holdings
 Shenzhen Media Group
 Shougang Concord International
 Sinochem Group
 Sinomach
 TCL
 Tencent
 Tianjin Development
 Tianjin Teda Company
 TP-Link
 Vanke
 Yatai Group
 Zhujiang Beer
 ZTE

Hong Kong

 Chow Tai Fook Enterprises
 CK Hutchison Holdings
 Dah Chong Hong
 First Pacific
 Henderson Investment
 Hong Kong Ferry
 Jardine Matheson
 Lai Sun Group
 Melco International Development
 Miramar Hotel and Investment
 NWS Holdings
 Swire Group
 The Wharf (Holdings)

State-owned conglomerates, China
 Beijing Enterprises
 China Resources
 China Travel International Investment Hong Kong
 CITIC Pacific
 COSCO (Hong Kong) Group
 Guangdong Investment
 Shougang Concord International

India

 ACG Group
 Action Group
 Adani Group
 Aditya Birla Group
 Ador Group
 Adventz Group
 Ajanta Group
 Alchemist Group
 Amalgamations Group
 Amara Raja Group
 Apeejay Surrendra Group
 Arvind
 Avantha Group
 Bajaj Group
 Baldota Group
 Bannari Amman Group
 Binani Industries
 Bird Group of Companies
 Bharti Enterprises
 Chettinad Group
 CK Birla Group
 Crown Group
 Dalmia Group
  Dabur Group
 Elecon Group
 Emami
 Enso Group
 Escorts Limited
 Essar Group
 Essel Group
 Finolex Group
 Financial Technologies Group
 Firodia Group
 Future Group
 GMR Group
 Godrej Group
 GVK Power & Infrastructure
 Hinduja Group
 Hero Group
 Indiabulls
 India Today Group
 Info Edge
 Inox Group
 ITC Limited
 Jaypee Group
 JBM Group(Jay Bharat Maruti)
 JSW Group
 Jubilant Bhartia Group
 Kalyani Group
 Karvy Group
 Khoday Group
 Kirloskar Group
 Lanco Infratech
 Larsen & Toubro
 M.P Birla Group
 Mahindra Group
 Manipal Education and Medical Group
 Max Group
 Mehta Group
 Modi Enterprises
 MRF
 Murugappa Group
 Muthoot Pappachan Group
 Navayuga Group
 National Dairy Development Board
 Peerless Group
 Piramal Group
 Poonawalla Group
 Raheja Group
 Ramoji Group
 Rane Group
 Raymond Group
 Rebel Foods
 Reliance Group
 Reliance Industries Limited
 RPG Group
 RPSG Group
 Sakthi Group
 Samvardhana Motherson Group
 Shapoorji Pallonji Group
 Shriram Group
 Sonalika Group
 S.R.S Group
 SUN Group
 Supreme Industries
 Tata Group
 TCG Group
 Thapar Group
 Thermax
 The Leela Group
 The Muthoot Group
 The Times Group
 Torrent Group
 Triveni Group
 TTK Group
 TVS Group
 United Breweries Group
 UTL Group
 V H Group
 V-Guard Industries
 Vadilal
 Vardhman Group of Companies
 Vedanta Group
 Videocon Group
 VRL Group
 Wadia Group
 Walchand group
 Wave Group
 Welspun Group
 Yash Birla Group

Indonesia
 Astra International
 Bakrie Group 
 Bumi Laut Group
 CT Corp 
 Elang Mahkota Teknologi
 Harita Group
 Kalbe Farma 
 Kompas Gramedia Group
 Lion Air
 Lippo Group
 Mayapada Group
 MNC Corporation
 Rajawali Corpora
 Salim Group
 Sinar Mas Group

Iran
 Aabsal
 Defense Industries Organization
 Ghadir Investment Company
 IDRO Group
 Iran Electronics Industries
 Maadiran Group

Israel
 Africa Israel Investments
 Delek
 International Metalworking Companies
 Israel Corporation

Japan

 Asahi Breweries
 Asahi Kasei
 Bandai Namco Holdings
 Furukawa Group
 Hitachi
 Itochu
 Japan Post Holdings
 Japan Railways Group
 Japan Tobacco
 JX Holdings
 Kadokawa Dwango
 Kao Corporation
 Kawasaki Heavy Industries
 Kirin Company, Limited
 Kodenshi AUK Group
 Konami
 Kubota
 Lotte
 Marubeni
 Mitsubishi
 Mitsui
 NEC
 Nintendo
 Nippon Telegraph and Telephone
 Nomura Group
 Panasonic
 Rakuten
 Sapporo Brewery
 Sega Sammy Holdings
 Seiyu Group
 Showa Denko
 Sojitz
 Sony
 Square Enix (Taito)
 Subaru Corporation
 Sumitomo Group
 Suntory
 Tokyu Group
 Toray Industries
 Toshiba
 Toyota Group
 Ube Industries
 Yamaha Corporation

Korea, South

 Aju Group
 CJ Group
 Daelim Group
 Dongbu Group
 Doosan Group
 Eugene Group
 GS Group
 Halla Group
 Hanjin
 Hansol
 Hanwha Group
 Hyosung
 Hyundai Group
 Hyundai Motor Group
 ILJIN Group
 Isu Group
 KT Corporation
 Kumho Asiana Group
 LG Corp
 Lotte
 LS Group
 Nongshim
 POSCO
 Samsung
 Shinsegae
 SK Group
 SPC Group
 SsangYong Group
 STX Corporation
 Taekwang Group
 Tongyang Group
 YTN Group

Macau
 Galaxy Entertainment Group
 Melco International Development
 Sociedade de Turismo e Diversões de Macau

Malaysia

 Berjaya Group
 DRB-HICOM
 Genting Group
 Hong Leong Group
 IOI Group
 Media Prima
 Johor Corporation
 Naza
 Petronas
 Sime Darby
 Sunway Group
 Usaha Tegas
 YTL Corporation
 UMW Holdings

Mongolia
 MAK Corporation
 Monnis Group
 Newcom Group
 Unitel Group

Myanmar
 Htoo Group of Companies
 Max Myanmar

Nepal
 Bhat-Bhateni Group
Chaudhary Group
 IME Group

Pakistan

 Atlas Group
 ARY Digital Network
 Bahria Town
 Dawood Group
 Dewan Mushtaq Group
 Engro Corporati
 Fecto Group
 House of Habib
Nishat Group
 Hashoo Group
 Jahangir Siddiqui Group
 Lakson Group
 Saif Group

Philippines

 Aboitiz Equity Ventures
 ABS-CBN Corporation
 Ayala Corporation
 Filinvest
 GMA Network, Inc.
 GT Capital Holdings
 JG Summit Holdings
 Lopez Group of Companies
 LT Group
 Metro Pacific Investments Corporation
 Motortrade
 San Miguel Corporation
 SM Investments Corporation
 Top Frontier Investment Holdings

Qatar

 Al Jazeera Media Network
 Industries Qatar
 Nehmeh
 Qatar Investment & Projects Development Holding Company
 Seashore Group

Saudi Arabia
 Dallah Al-Baraka
 Kingdom Holding
 SABIC
 Saudi Aramco
 Saudi Binladin Group

Singapore
 ComfortDelGro
 Keppel Corporation
 Pacific Century Regional Developments Limited

Sri Lanka
 Aitken Spence
 Distilleries Company of Sri Lanka
 Hayleys
 Hemas Holdings
 John Keells Holdings

Taiwan

85C Bakery Cafe
Acer
Asus
Bank of Kaohsiung
Chatime
Chunghwa Telecom
Evergreen Marine
Faraday Technology
Giant Bicycles
HTC
Maxxis
MediaTek
Microtek
MSI
Mustek
Taiwan Beer
Taiwan Mobile
TKK Fried Chicken
TSMC
UMC
Zyxel

Thailand

 Central Group
 Charoen Pokphand Group
 The Erawan Group
 Intouch Holdings
 Minor International
 PTT Group
 Samart Group
 Siam Cement Group

United Arab Emirates
 Al-Futtaim Group
 Al-Ghurair Group
 Aster DM Healthcare
 Dubai World
 Landmark Group
 LuLu Group International
 RP Group
 Stallion Group

Vietnam
 EVN
 Petrovietnam
 Viettel
 Petrolimex
 VinGroup
 Vinacomin
 VNPT

Europe

Austria
 Andritz AG
 Red Bull GmbH
 Voestalpine AG

Azerbaijan
 AF Holding
 Azersun Holding
 PASHA Holding

Belgium
 Ackermans & van Haaren
 Anheuser-Busch InBev
 Groupe Bruxelles Lambert
 Sofina

Croatia
 Agrokor

Czech republic
 Agrofert
 ČEZ
 Energetický a průmyslový holding
 PPF

Denmark
 Carlsberg Group
 Maersk

Finland

 Amer Sports
 Fiskars
 Kemira
 Kesko
 Kone
 Metso
 Neste
 Nokia
 Patria
 S Group
 UPM
 Valmet
 Wärtsilä

France

 Alstom
 Areva
 AXA
 Bolloré
 Bouygues
 Danone
 Dassault Group
 Engie
 Groupe Casino
 Groupe SEB
 Kering
 Lactalis
 Lagardère Group
 Louis Dreyfus Group
 LVMH
 Pernod Ricard
 PSA Peugeot Citroën
 Renault
 Safran
 Schneider Electric
 Technicolor SA
 Total S.A.
 Veolia Environment
 Vivendi

Germany

 BASF
 Bayer AG
 Bertelsmann
 Mercedes-Benz AG
 Evonik Industries
 GEA Group
 Robert Bosch GmbH
 Schaeffler Technologies GmbH & Co. KG
 Siemens AG
 ThyssenKrupp AG
 Volkswagen AG
 Fresenius (company)
 Freudenberg Group
 Linde plc

Gibraltar
 SIMPLE Group

Greece
 Marfin Investment Group
 Mytilineos Holdings
 OTE
 Vivartia

Ireland
 Cooper Industries
 DCC

Italy

 Assicurazioni Generali
 Barilla Group
 CIR Group
 CNH Industrial
 Enel
 Eni
 Exor
 Ferrero SpA
 Fincantieri
 Fininvest
 Gruppo Campari
 Italcementi
 Leonardo
 Luxottica
 Mediaset
 RCS MediaGroup
 ST Microelectronics
 Techint
 UniCredit

Netherlands
 DSM
 Heineken Group
 Philips
 SHV Holdings
 AkzoNobel
 Stellantis

Norway

 Aker ASA
 Bonheur
 Fred. Olsen & Co.
 Ganger Rolf ASA
 Kongsberg Gruppen
 Norsk Hydro
 Orkla Group
 Telenor
 Tomra

Portugal

 Altri
 Cofina
 Corticeira Amorim
 EDP
 Galp Energia
 Grupo José de Mello
 Grupo RAR
 Grupo Salvador Caetano
 Impresa
 Jerónimo Martins
 Media Capital
 Mota-Engil
 Semapa
 Soares da Costa
 Sogrape
 Sonae
 Sumol + Compal
 Teixeira Duarte
 Unicer
 Visabeira

Romania
 Țiriac Holdings

Russia
 Alfa Group
 Basic Element
 Interros
 OMZ
 Renova Group
Rostec
Sistema

Serbia
 Delta
 MK Group

Spain

 Abengoa
 Abertis
 Acciona
 Altadis
 Endesa
 Ferrovial
 Grupo Vocento
 Iberdrola
 Inditex
 Mediaset España Comunicación
 Mondragon Corporation
 PRISA
 Repsol
 Santander Group
 SENER
 Telefónica

Sweden
 Atlas Copco
 Electrolux
 Ericsson
 Sandvik
 Trelleborg AB
 Volvo Group

Switzerland
 ABB Group
 Nestlé
 Stadler Rail

Turkey

 Doğan Holding
 Doğuş Holding
 Eczacıbaşı
 Koç Holding
 Sabancı Holding
 Ugur Group Companies
 Yıldız Holding
 Zorlu Holding

Ukraine
 SCM Holdings

United Kingdom

 Acromas Holdings
 Anime Limited
 Anglo American plc
 Associated British Foods
 BAE Systems
 Bestway
 BHP
 British American Tobacco
 Caparo
 Co-operative Group
 Diageo
 easyGroup
 Experian
 IHG Hotels & Resorts
 Imperial Tobacco
 Invensys
 Johnson Matthey
 Libra Group
 Merlin Entertainments
 Reckitt Benckiser
 Rio Tinto
 Rolls-Royce Holdings
 Seamark Group
 Smiths Group
 Swire Group
 Tomkins
 Unilever
 Virgin Group
 Weir Group

North America

Canada 

 Anthem Sports & Entertainment
 Argus Corporation
 Barrick Gold
 Bell
 Blackberry Limited
 Boat Rocker Media
 Bombardier Inc.
 CAE Inc.
 Calfrac Well Services
 Calian
 Canadian Broadcasting Corporation
 Canadian Utilities
 CGI Inc.
 Cineplex Entertainment
 Corus Entertainment
 Empire Company
 Franco-Nevada
 J. D. Irving
 Jim Pattison Group
 Loblaw Companies
 Mindgeek
 Power Corporation of Canada
 Quebecor
 Rogers Communications
 Royal Bank of Canada
 Shaw Communications
 TC Energy
 Telus Corporation
 Thomson Reuters
 Toronto-Dominion Bank
 Torstar
 Triple Five Group

Costa Rica
 Florida Ice and Farm Company

Cuba
 Cubatabaco
 Habanos

Dominican Republic
 CND
 Grupo Corripio
 Grupo León Jimenes

Jamaica 
Grace Kennedy and Company Limited
Lasco Jamaica

Mexico 

 ALFA
 América Móvil
 Arca Continental
 Cervecería de Baja California
 Cuauhtémoc Moctezuma Brewery
 FEMSA
 Grupo Aeroportuario Centro Norte
 Grupo Aeroportuario del Pacífico
 Grupo Aeroportuario del Sureste
 Grupo Bimbo
 Grupo Carso
 Grupo Elektra
 Grupo Empresarial Ángeles
 Grupo Lala
 Grupo México
 Grupo Modelo
 Grupo Salinas
 Grupo Tampico
 MVS Comunicaciones
 Pemex
 Soriana
 Televisa

United States 

 3M
 Access Industries
 Advanced Micro Devices
 Alphabet
 Altra Industrial Motion
 Altria
 Amazon
 Amblin Partners
 AMC Networks
 AMC Theatres
 Ametek
 Analog Devices
 Apple
 AT&T
 Authentic Brands Group
 Berkshire Hathaway
 Blackstone
 Boeing
 Brunswick Corporation
 Carlisle Companies
 Cascade Investment
 Cedar Fair
 Charter Communications
 Cinemark
 Colgate-Palmolive
 Comcast
 Crane
 Danaher Corporation
 Dell Technologies
 Discotek Media
 Dover Corporation
 Dow Chemical Company
 DuPont
 DXC Technology
 Eaton Corporation
 EDGE Tech
 Emerson Electric
 Entertainment Studios
 Ford
 Fox Corporation
 Gannett
 General Dynamics
 General Electric
 General Mills
 General Motors
 Gray Television
 Griffon Corporation
 Hasbro
 Hearst Corporation
 Hendricks Holding Company
 Hewlett Packard Enterprise
 The Hershey Company
 Herschend Family Entertainment
 Honeywell
 Hormel
 HP
 Hubbard Broadcasting
 IAC
 Ilitch Holdings
 Illinois Tool Works
 InFocus
 Intel Corporation
 ITT Corporation
 Jarden
 Johnson & Johnson
 Johnson Controls
 Kellogg's
 KEMET Corporation
 Kino Lorber
 Koch Industries
 Kohler
 Kraft Heinz
 Keurig Dr Pepper
 Leucadia National
 Leonard Green & Partners
 Liberty Media
 Libra Group
 Lionsgate
 Lockheed Martin
 Loews Corporation
 Magnavox
 Mandalay Entertainment Group
 M&F Worldwide
 Mars
 Meta Platforms
 Microsoft Corporation
 Mondelēz International
 Motorola Solutions
 NACCO Industries
 National Presto Industries
 Newell Brands
 News Corp
 Nexstar Media Group
 Nike
 Nvidia
 Northrop Grumman
 Olin Corporation
 Parker Hannifin
 Pentair
 PepsiCo
 PerkinElmer
 Philip Morris International
 Procter & Gamble
 Qurate Retail Group
 Raven Industries
 Raytheon Technologies
 Red Apple Group
 Regal Entertainment Group
 Renco Group
 Reynolds American
 Right Stuf
 Roper Technologies
 S.C. Johnson
 Seaboard Corporation
 SeaWorld Parks & Entertainment
 Sentai Filmworks
 Sinclair Broadcast Group
 SPX Corporation
 Sony Corporation of America
 Spyglass Media Group
 Teledyne Technologies
 Textron
 Timken Company
 Tribune Publishing
 Trinity Industries
 Univision Communications
 Paramount Global
 Viz Media
 Vizio
 Tegna
 The Walt Disney Company
 Wonderful Company
 Warner Bros. Discovery
 Xerox
 Xylem

South America

Argentina
 Grupo Arcor
 Grupo Clarín
 Techint
 YPF

Bolivia
 Banco Mercantil Santa Cruz
 Banco Nacional de Bolivia

Brazil

 AmBev
 Andrade Gutierrez
 Banco Bradesco
 Banco do Brasil
 BRF
 Camargo Corrêa
 Cosan
 EBX Group
 Eletrobras
 Embraer
 GPA
 Grupo Abril
 Grupo Bandeirantes de Comunicação
 Grupo Folha
 Grupo Globo
 Grupo Petrópolis
 Grupo RBS
 Grupo Record
 Grupo Silvio Santos
 Hypermarcas
 Itaúsa
 JBS
 Marfrig
 Odebrecht
 Petrobras
 Safra Group
 Souza Cruz
 Synergy Group
 Ultrapar
 Vale
 Votorantim Group

Chile

 AntarChile
 Banco de Chile
 CCU
 Cencosud
 Concha y Toro
 Empresas Copec
 Enersis
 Falabella
 Quiñenco
 Sigdo Koppers

Colombia

 Alpina Productos Alimenticios
 Bavaria
 Ecopetrol
 EPM
 Grupo Argos
 Grupo Aval Acciones y Valores
 Grupo Bancolombia
 Grupo Empresarial Antioqueño
 Grupo Éxito
 Grupo Nutresa
 Grupo Sura
 Organización Ardila Lülle
 Organizacion Corona
 Quala
 Synergy Group

Paraguay

 Grupo Cartes

Peru
 Grupo Romero (familia Romero): Alicorp, Credicorp, Banco de Crédito del Perú, Primax, etc. 
 Grupo Breca de Alex Fort Brescia, Ana Maria Brescia Cafferata, etc. 
 Intercorp de Carlos Rodriguez-Pastor: Interbank, Supermercados Peruanos, GlobalNet, etc. 
 Grupo Gloria de Vito Rodriguez Rodriguez
 Ajegroup
 Corporación Lindley S.A.
 Enrique Cassinelli and Sons

Venezuela
 CANTV
 Corporación Venezolana de Guayana
 Empresas 1BC
 Empresas Polar
 Grupo Cisneros
 Mercantil Servicios Financieros
 PDVSA

Oceania

Australia

 Foster's Group
 Madman Entertainment
 Pacific Dunlop
 Siren Visual
 Toll Group
 Village Roadshow
 Washington H Soul Pattinson
 Wesfarmers
 Woolworths

New Zealand
 Infratil
 The Warehouse Group

Defunct conglomerates

Argentina
 Bunge y Born

Australia

 Adelaide Steamship Company
 Bond Corporation
 BTR Nylex
 Clyde Industries
 Howard Smith Limited
 Johns Perry
 Mayne Group
 Pacific Dunlop
 Southcorp

Belgium
 InBev
 Interbrew
 Société Générale de Belgique

Brazil
 Companhia Cervejaria Brahma

Canada
 Alliance Atlantis Communications
 Alliance Films
 Astral Media
 Peace Arch Entertainment
 Phase 4 Films
 Seagram

Colombia
 D.M.G. Grupo Holding S.A.

Denmark
 East Asiatic Company

France
 Crédit Lyonnais

Germany
 AEG
 Cassella
 Daimler-Benz
 Hoechst AG
 IG Farben
 Thyssen AG
 Volkswagen

Italy
 Breda
 Caproni
 Fiat SpA
 Gio. Ansaldo & C.

Korea, South
 Daewoo
 Keo-Pyung

Ukraine
 Yuzhmash

United States

 ACME Communications
 American Broadcasting-Paramount Theatres
 Atari Corporation
 Atari Games
 Cadence Industries
 Cablevision
 CBS Corporation
 Combustion Engineering
 Carolco Pictures
 Cox Enterprises
 Defy Media
 Discovery Inc.
 Douglas Aircraft Company
 General Cinema
 General Foods
 Goodtimes Entertainment
 Grumman
 Gulf and Western Industries
 Hearst Corporation
 Heinz
 Heublein
 Hewlett-Packard
 Kinney National Company
 Kraft Foods
 Kraft Foods (1903–2012)
 Level 3 Communications
 Ling-Temco-Vought
 Lockheed Corporation
 Lorimar-Telepictures
 Martin Marietta
 MCA Inc.
 McDonnell Aircraft
 McDonnell Douglas
 Motorola
 Midway Games
 News Corporation
 Northrop Corporation
 Paramount Communications
 Raycom Media
 RJR Nabisco
 RKO General
 Spelling Entertainment Group
 Standard Oil
 The 3DO Company
 The Tribune Company
 The Weinstein Company
 Time Warner Cable
 TRW Inc.
 Tribune Media
 TW Telecom
 TVX Broadcast Group
 US West
 Viacom (1952–2006)
 Viacom (2005–2019)
 Warner Communications
 WarnerMedia

See also
 List of multinational corporations

References

Lists of companies